Leigh is a constituency in Greater Manchester represented in the House of Commons of the UK Parliament since 2019 by James Grundy of the Conservative Party.

Before this, the seat was represented by Andy Burnham of the Labour Party, who served as the MP from 2001, and Shadow Home Secretary in Jeremy Corbyn's Shadow Cabinet until October 2016. Burnham stood down following his victory at the 2017 Greater Manchester mayoral election, and was succeeded by the Labour and Cooperative Party's Jo Platt who was MP from 2017 to 2019. Burnham, who was re-elected as Mayor of Greater Manchester in 2021 with an increased majority, still resides in the Leigh constituency.

Constituency profile

Leigh is a marginal seat in the south of the Metropolitan Borough of Wigan and on the border with Warrington, with virtually all wards held by the Labour Party at local level, although it does contain the more Conservative-inclined area of Lowton East. In line with the wider borough of Wigan it voted by a majority to Leave the European Union in the 2016 referendum, but has slightly lower levels of deprivation than the town of Wigan itself, and is mostly made of skilled working-class families in residential areas, with some light industry, all factors in the swing towards the Conservatives in 2019. Leigh, Tyldesley and Golborne are former mill and mining towns undergoing urban regeneration. Pennington Flash in between Lowton and Leigh is an important local nature reserve and area of natural regeneration in a former mining area.

Boundaries
Following the review of parliamentary representation in Greater Manchester in 2009, the Boundary Commission for England recommended alterations to constituencies in the Wigan area. The electoral wards used in the altered Leigh constituency are:

Astley, Mosley Common, Atherleigh, Golborne and Lowton West, Leigh East, Leigh South, Leigh West, Lowton East and Tyldesley all from the Metropolitan Borough of Wigan

History
The constituency was created in the Redistribution of Seats Act 1885 as a result of the South West Lancashire constituency being divided into eight single member seats. Between 1922 and December 2019, candidates belonging to the Labour Party had continuously served the seat, which for the political party made it one of their longest held constituencies. One recent Labour incumbent was Andy Burnham, Shadow Home Secretary from September 2015 to October 2016.

Members of Parliament

Elections

Elections in the 2010s

The 2019 result saw the largest 2017 majority for a party overturned in the country. It also saw the largest fall in the UKIP vote share.

Elections in the 2000s

Elections in the 1990s

Elections in the 1980s

Elections in the 1970s

Elections in the 1960s

Elections in the 1950s

Election in the 1940s

Elections in the 1930s

Elections in the 1920s

Elections in the 1910s 

General Election 1914–15

Another General Election was required to take place before the end of 1915. The political parties had been making preparations for an election to take place and by the July 1914, the following candidates had been selected:
Liberal: Peter Raffan
Unionist: Frank Hatchard
Labour: Thomas Greenall

Elections in the 1900s

Elections in the 1890s

Elections in the 1880s

See also
List of parliamentary constituencies in Greater Manchester

Notes

References

Parliamentary constituencies in Greater Manchester
Constituencies of the Parliament of the United Kingdom established in 1885
Politics of the Metropolitan Borough of Wigan
Leigh, Greater Manchester